Stony Point Center is one of three conference centers of the Presbyterian Church (USA). The other two conference and retreat centers are Ghost Ranch and Montreat. Stony Point Center welcomes people of all faiths and nations to discern, discover, learn, and lead.

The facility began about 150 years ago as a ministry of hospitality shaped by four daughters of a Presbyterian minister.

In a given year, the center with its 180-bed campus welcomes a wide variety of groups who come to hold their own programs/retreats. Stony Point Center sponsors programming focused on nonviolence, peace and justice, environment, spiritual practices, and church issues. Since 2009, it has been the spiritual home of the Community of Living Traditions.

Stony Point Center is a Ministry of the Presbyterian Church, (USA).

In 2000, Stony Point Center established the "John Garcia Gensel Award for Integrating Faith and the Arts"; the first award was given that year to Dave Brubeck.

References

Presbyterian Church (USA)
Spiritual retreats
Buildings and structures in Rockland County, New York